The bocce competitions at the 2013 Mediterranean Games in Mersin took place between 25 June and 29 June at the Toroslar Bocce Facility.

Athletes competed in 10 events across 3 disciplines: lyonnaise, pétanque and raffa.

Medal table

Medal summary

Lyonnaise

Pétanque

Raffa

References

http://www.worldbulletin.net/?aType=haber&ArticleID=112003
https://web.archive.org/web/20130702093150/http://info.mersin2013.gov.tr/disiplineDetails_BO.aspx

Sports at the 2013 Mediterranean Games
2013
2013 in bowls